The Scarlet Letter is a 1973 period drama film directed by Wim Wenders, based on Nathaniel Hawthorne's 1850 novel of the same name. The West German-Spanish co-production stars Senta Berger as Hester Prynne, Lou Castel as Reverend Dimmesdale, and Hans Christian Blech as Chillingworth.

Cast

Production 
Filming took place at a studio in Cologne, with exteriors shot in Galicia, Spain. The look of the evening shots outdoors utilized the existing day for night techniques of exposure.

According to the director's commentary, Wim Wenders explained that the experience of directing this, his second film, was the usual one which occurs with a new director. It is much more difficult and much less successful.  In the interior shots, the windows were covered with a variant of rice paper seen in traditional Japanese homes.

There are a few brief shots in which one sees a three-masted ship on the ocean in the background.  This was not a real ship but was a small model sized correctly for the shot and hung in front of the lens (called forced perspective). Only one extra building had to be erected in Galicia for the exterior shooting to hide the large gap between buildings.

As far as the actors were concerned, they were from all over Europe and so all of the dialogue had to be looped afterward. Six or seven different languages were being spoken by the actors.  The extras which represent the inhabitants of Salem were all Spaniards.

See also
Scarlet Letter (disambiguation), a disambiguation page for other film versions of the story

External links
 Official website
 

1973 films
1970s historical drama films
German historical drama films
West German films
Films directed by Wim Wenders
Films based on The Scarlet Letter
Films shot in Madrid
Films shot in Cologne
Films scored by Jürgen Knieper
1970s German-language films
Spanish historical drama films
1970s German films